The 2023 Vitality Blast will be the 2023 season of the T20 Blast, a professional Twenty20 cricket league played in England and Wales. The tournament is scheduled to be held from 20 May to 15 July 2023. It will be the sixth season in which the domestic T20 competition, run by the England and Wales Cricket Board (ECB), will be branded as the Vitality Blast due to the tournament's sponsorship. The Hampshire Hawks are the defending champions, having won their third title during the previous season. On 30 November 2022, the ECB announced the fixtures for the tournament.

Format
The playing format is the same as the previous season, where groups remain the same with the familiar North and South split, while each county will play 14 group-stage matches, seven at home and seven away.

Teams
The teams were divided into the following groups:
 North Group: Birmingham Bears, Derbyshire Falcons, Durham, Lancashire Lightning, Leicestershire Foxes, Northants Steelbacks, Notts Outlaws, Worcestershire Rapids, Yorkshire Vikings
 South Group: Essex Eagles, Glamorgan, Gloucestershire, Hampshire Hawks, Kent Spitfires, Middlesex, Somerset, Surrey, Sussex Sharks

North Group

South Group

References

External links
 Series home at ESPN Cricinfo

2023 in English cricket